Puerto Rico competed at the 1980 Summer Olympics in Moscow, USSR. Notably, in partial support of the American-led boycott of the 1980 Summer Olympics athletes competed under the Olympic Flag.

Results by event

Boxing
Flyweight (– 51 kg)
 Alberto Mercado
 First round — bye
 Second round — lost to  after referee stopped contest in first round

Featherweight (– 57 kg)
 Luis Pizarro
 First round — bye
 Second round — defeated  after referee stopped contest in third round
 Third round — defeated  on points (5-0)

Light-Welterweight (– 63.5 kg)
 José Angel Molina
 First round — defeated  on points (5-0) 
 Second round — defeated  after referee stopped contest in third round
 Quarterfinals — lost to  retired

References
Official Olympic Reports

Nations at the 1980 Summer Olympics
1980
Oly